Sowrey is a surname. Notable people with the surname include:

Ben Sowrey (born 1991), English rugby union player
Frederick Sowrey (1893–1968), flying ace of the First World War
Freddie Sowrey (1922–2019), senior Royal Air Force officer, son of Frederick

See also
Sorey